Lampart may refer to:

People
 Dawid Lampart (born 1990), Polish motorcycle speedway rider
 Wiktor Lampart (born 2001), Polish international speedway rider
 William Lamport or Lampart (1611/1615–1659), Irish Catholic adventurer

Other uses
 Lampart FC, a Hungarian football club based in Budapest
 PZL.48 Lampart, a Polish heavy fighter-bomber design that was never manufactured due to the outbreak of World War II
 Blaufränkisch, a variety of grape also known as Lampart

See also
 Lamport (disambiguation)